Dores de Campos is a Brazilian municipality. It is about 40 kilometers from São João del Rey at BR-265. About 30% of active people work in its principal factory: Marluvas.

As its neighbors cities, Dores de Campos is a point of Real Way (translated of Estrada Real).

It was founded in about 1720 and became a city on December 17, 1938.

Geography 
According to IBGE (2017), the municipality is in the Immediate Geographic Region of Barbacena, in the Intermediate Geographic Region of Barbacena.

Ecclesiastical circumscription 
The municipality is part of the Roman Catholic Diocese of São João del-Rei.

References

Municipalities in Minas Gerais